Sabine Werner (born 5 September 1960) is a German biochemist and professor.

Biography
Sabine Werner was born on 5 September 1960 in Tübingen, Germany. She attended Universities of Tubingen and Munich where she studied Biochemistry. Her PhD was in cancer research at the Max Planck Institute of Biochemistry, completed in 1989. Werner then went to the University of California San Francisco working on growth factor action and tissue repair. Werner took a position as group leader at the Max-Planck-Institute from 1993 to 1999 while also working as an Associate Professor in the Ludwig-Maximilians-University of Munich.In 1999 Werner became the Professor of Cell Biology at ETH Zürich. Werner was awarded the Pfizer Academic Award in 1998.

Research 
Werner is known for her research on tissue regeneration, especially focusing on growth factors and reactive oxygen species. Her research has potential applications to the study of cancer.

Selected publications

Awards 
Elected member, European Academy of Sciences (2020)
Elected member, European Molecular Biology Organization (2012)
Elected member, German National Academy of Sciences Leopoldina (2011)

Sources

German biochemists
1960 births
Living people
People from Tübingen
Academic staff of ETH Zurich
Max Planck Society alumni